The Alcoholic Beverage Laws Enforcement Commission, often referred to as the ABLE Commission, is an agency of the state of Oklahoma. The ABLE Commission is charged with protecting the public welfare and interest through the enforcement of state laws pertaining to alcoholic
beverages, charity games, and youth access to tobacco.

Divisions
Administrative Services Division - 6 Full Time Equivalent (FTE) employees. 
Business Office Division - 13 FTE employees. 
Enforcement Division - 25 FTE employees. 
 The Enforcement Division is divided into 3 district offices and 3 specialty sections which help facilitate the agency's duties throughout the state. 
Oklahoma City District Office
Tulsa District Office
McAlester District Office
Wholesalers - OKC
Special Events / Public Information - OKC
Education and Compliance - OKC

Rank structure

Fallen officers
Since the establishment of the Oklahoma Alcoholic Beverage Laws Enforcement Commission, two officers have died while on duty.

See also

List of law enforcement agencies in Oklahoma

References

External links
 ABLE Commission official website

State law enforcement agencies of Oklahoma
State alcohol agencies of the United States